The Bindal are an Indigenous Australian people of the state of North Queensland.

Language
Bindal (Bendalgubba, Nyawaygi) is an extinct Australian Aboriginal language of the Pama–Nyungan language family. Bowern suggests that it might have been a Maric language. Gavan Breen has classified it as one of the Lower Burdekin languages yet presumes that one of two Lower Burdekin languages, which he concluded were not Maric, is Bindal. Only some confused word lists survive bearing on Bindal.

Country
The Bindal's coastal reaches lay around the Burdekin River's outlet into the Coral Sea at Upstart Bay, running northwards as far as Cape Cleveland and inland to the Leichhardt Range. They were the indigenous people of Ayr.

Alternative names
 Bendalgubber
 North Murri

Notes

Citations

Sources

(corrected 6 February 2012)

 

Aboriginal peoples of Queensland